The 10th Golden Horse Awards (Mandarin:第10屆金馬獎) took place on October 30, 1972, at Zhongshan Hall in Taipei, Taiwan.

Winners and nominees 
Winners are listed first, highlighted in boldface.

References

10th
1972 film awards
1972 in Taiwan